Maxey Dell "Max" Moody III (born January 16, 1944), also known as M. D. Moody III, is the former CEO of M. D. Moody & Sons, Inc. and the former President of MOBRO Marine, Inc. Max also founded Dell Marine, Moody Fabrication & Machine, Inc., and co-founded the incorporation of Moody Brothers of Jacksonville to MOBRO Marine, Inc.

Early life

Maxey Dell Moody III was born in Jacksonville, Florida on January 16, 1944. Max was the first son of Dorothy (née Boyd) and Maxey Dell Moody Jr. His maternal grandfather Thomas Boyd was born in England in 1885 and his maternal grandmother Dorothy (née Riordan) was born in Ireland in 1891. His paternal grandfather Maxey Dell Moody was president and founder of M. D. Moody & Sons, Inc. while his father Maxey Moody Jr. was vice president at the time of his birth. In 1949 Maxey Moody Sr. died leaving Maxey Moody Jr. as president and his uncle Muller Moody as vice president when Max was 5 years old. At a young age Max was exposed to his grandfather's business M. D. Moody accompanying his father on various work projects along with his younger brother Boyd.

Max attended Assumption Catholic School graduating in 1957 and then Bishop Kenny High School graduating in 1961. After graduating from high school Max worked with his father at M. D. Moody & Sons doing many jobs as a technician, operations manager and executive. Max also worked at his father's newly formed company Moody Brothers of Jacksonville in the early 1960s as one of the first tug and barge technicians.

Career

M. D. Moody & Sons

Max became President and CEO of M. D. Moody when his father Max Moody Jr. died in 1987. Max continued the diversification process of M. D. Moody with further subsidiaries such as Moody Light Equipment Rental, Moody Fabrication & Machine, Inc. and an acquisition of a local Sea Ray boat dealership. Max also began offering refurbished American cranes in conjunction with other manufacturers it represents. In 1992 Moody Brothers of Jacksonville became a corporate spin-off of M. D. Moody and renamed MOBRO Marine, Inc.. Max also became Vice President of MOBRO Marine. M. D. Moody under Max Moody III reached a modest growth in the construction industry by utilizing its equipment on construction projects such as Alltel Stadium and the Acosta Bridge.

Moody Fabrication & Machine
Moody Fabrication & Machine, Inc. was established in 1994 by Max that fabricated metal fabrication and utilized barges to transport heavy equipment. In 1995 M. D. Moody purchased a shipyard on the Intracoastal Waterway where Moody Fabrication & Machine was reestablished for ten years.

Dell Marine
In 2004 Max wanted to continue the diversification process by establishing a local boat dealership and marine business. Max's boat dealership became known as Dell Marine with his middle name used for the business. Dell Marine Tug & Barge was also established in 2004 by Max as a subsidiary of M. D. Moody & Sons, Inc. Dell Marine offers services in tug and barge in conjunction with the construction industry or other marine related projects. According to The St. Augustine Record, 600 tons of concrete pipes and storm water boxes were added to an offshore reef in June 2008 "by Max Moody's barge and tug (Dell Marine). In July 2009 Max's Dell Marine Tug and Barge prepared a decommissioned USCG seagoing buoy tender to become an artificial reef. The shipyard at Moody Fabrication & Machine, Inc. outfitted the ship and then towed it out to sea where it is now an artificial reef off Naval Station Mayport. Off the coast of Flagler County, Florida in 2011 Dell Marine transported and dropped material used to create an artificial reef. In August 2013 a tugboat called Anger Management of Salonen Marine departed from Max's shipyard to a site 20 nautical miles off Mayport, Florida to establish another artificial reef.

Decline of M. D. Moody & Sons
In 2005 Max relinquished his position as President of M. D. Moody to his daughter Elizabeth "Lisa" Moody but still retained CEO. In 2009 the Great Recession took a toll on M. D. Moody forcing the company to file for Chapter 11, Title 11, United States Code. Max says on the Chapter 11 filing that M. D. Moody had no choice but to seek protection to honor the creditors and employees. During the Chapter 11 filing M. D. Moody closed the Tampa, Fort Myers, Pompano Beach and Mobile branches. The subsidiaries Moody Machinery Corp. and Southeast Crane Parts were then liquidated by 2011 leaving Dell Marine and Dell Marine Tug and Barge the only M. D. Moody subsidiaries to survive the Great Recession. Max attempted to further liquidate assets of M. D. Moody by turning the Moody Fabrication & Machine shipyard, which was owned by his real estate firm Moody Land Company, from an industrial waterfront into commercial purposes through a proposal to the Jacksonville City Council. Max sold the shipyard which was owned by his real estate company Moody Land Company in October 2014 for $9.4 million to a local Jacksonville developer.

Personal life

Family
Max married Judy Maxwell, daughter of Ray and Nellie Maxwell, in 1963. They had nine children including one named Mary that died at birth in 1980 and fifteen grandchildren. At Moody Fabrication & Machine, Inc. Max named a tugboat after his daughter Susan and a pushboat at Dell Marine named Madilyn after his granddaughter.

His grandson Andrew R. Nicholas is an author and historian. Maxey named a pushboat built at Moody Fabrication & Machine the Andy after his grandson.

Notes

References
Bloomberg Business
Directory of Corporate Affiliations (1995). "Directory." National Register Publishing Co. Staff
Dun & Bradstreet Reference Book of Corporate Managements (2008). "MD MOODY & SONS INC". Dun & Bradstreet, Inc.
Gianoulis, Deborah and Lawrence Smith (1998). "Jacksonville: Reflection of Excellence." Towery Publishing, Inc.
Marlow-Ferguson, Rebecca (1999). "American Wholesalers & Distributors Directory." Wholesale Trade.
Ward's Business Directory of U.S. Private and Public Companies (1997). Volume 4. Gale Research. 
Weaver, Delores Barr and J. Wayne Weaver (2001). "Jacksonville: Crown of the First Coast". Towery Publishing, Inc.
Worldwide Ship and Boat Repair Facilities (1996). "Mariner's Directory & Guide." Volume 1. Marine Techniques, Inc.

People from Jacksonville, Florida
1944 births
Living people
American company founders
American construction businesspeople
American businesspeople in shipping